Valis (also Romanized as Valīs) is a village in Chavarzaq Rural District, Chavarzaq District, Tarom County, Zanjan Province, Iran. At the 2006 census, its population was 497, in 102 families.

References 

Populated places in Tarom County